Mōkau Falls is a cascade located at the head of Mōkau Inlet in New Zealand's Lake Waikaremoana.

See also
New Zealand Waterfalls

References

Wairoa District
Waterfalls of New Zealand
Landforms of the Hawke's Bay Region